The 2019 L'Open 35 de Saint-Malo was a professional tennis tournament played on outdoor clay courts. It was the twenty-fourth edition of the tournament which was part of the 2019 ITF Women's World Tennis Tour. It took place in Saint-Malo, France between 16 and 22 September 2019.

Singles main-draw entrants

Seeds

 1 Rankings are as of 9 September 2019.

Other entrants
The following players received wildcards into the singles main draw:
  Tessah Andrianjafitrimo
  Lou Brouleau
  Alice Ramé
  Maryna Zanevska

The following players received entry from the qualifying draw:
  Audrey Albié
  Eva Guerrero Álvarez
  Guiomar Maristany
  Eléonora Molinaro
  Daniela Seguel
  Stephanie Wagner
  Lucie Wargnier
  Margot Yerolymos

Champions

Singles

 Varvara Gracheva def.  Marta Kostyuk, 6–3, 6–2

Doubles

 Ekaterine Gorgodze /  Maryna Zanevska def.  Aliona Bolsova /  Tereza Mrdeža, 6–7(8–10), 7–5, [10–8]

References

External links
 2019 L'Open 35 de Saint-Malo at ITFtennis.com
 Official website

2019 ITF Women's World Tennis Tour
2019 in French tennis
September 2019 sports events in France
L'Open 35 de Saint-Malo